The Washington Policy Center (WPC) is a think tank based in the state of Washington. The organization's mission statement is "to promote sound public policy based on free-market solutions." It has a statewide staff of 25 and offices in Seattle, Olympia, Spokane, and Richland. The organization is divided into eight research centers: Agriculture, Education, Environment, Government Reform, Health Care, Small Business, Transportation, and Worker Rights.

WPC operates a free public-service website, WashingtonVotes.org, which tracks what bills state legislators introduce and support. WashingtonVotes.org provides a roll call service to state media outlets while the legislature is in session.

Research centers

Washington Policy Center comprises eight research centers: Education, Environment, Government Reform, Health Care, Small Business, Transportation, Worker Rights, and Agriculture. The research centers were funded and opened as part of a $4.1 million capital campaign.

Center for Education
WPC's Center for Education "conducts objective research and makes practical policy recommendations to improve Washington state's ability to carry out its paramount duty to educate every child within its borders." The center is a strong advocate for school choice and is a leading proponent of charter schools in Washington state.

In 2008, the center published Education Reform Plan: 8 Practical Ways to Improve Public Education in Washington State. The recommendations include:

 Put the principal in charge 
 Give parents choice among public schools 
 Let teachers teach 
 Double teacher pay 
 Replace the WASL with another standard 
 Create no-excuses schools 
 Transparency - put school budgets and teacher qualifications online 
 Make the Superintendent of Public Instruction an appointed office

Initiative on agriculture
WPC's Initiative on Agriculture, its newest research arm, puts the knowledge and experience of those who work the land at the center of agriculture policy by using free-market incentives and local solutions. This new initiative encourages policymakers to reduce the burden of excessive and unproductive regulation on family farmers and taxpayers.

Center for Environment

WPC's Center for the Environment, led by Todd Myers, "brings balance to the environmental debate by promoting the idea that human progress and prosperity work in a free economy to protect the environment."

Center for Government Reform
WPC's Center for Government Reform's (budget and tax) mission is to "partner with stakeholders and citizens to work toward a government focused on its core functions while improving its transparency, accountability, performance, and effectiveness for taxpayers." Jason Mercier leads WPC's efforts in government reform.

Center for Health Care

WPC's Center for Health Care is led by retired heart surgeon Dr. Roger Stark. The center develops "patient-centered solutions to reduce costs and improve the availability and quality of health care for businesses and individuals, providing the only detailed, independent critique of health care issues available in the Northwest."

Center for Transportation
WPC's Center for Transportation "researches and analyzes the best practices for relieving traffic congestion by recapturing a vision of a system based on freedom of movement."

The center uncovered an error in Sound Transit's defense in a $500 million class-action lawsuit filed by taxpayers regarding the collection of car tab tax charges. The state Attorney General's office acknowledged the error and declined to take Sound Transit’s side in the case, pulling out just one hour prior to a scheduled hearing before the State Supreme Court. The constitutionality of the car-tab collection levied by Sound Transit was upheld by the State Supreme Court in February 2020.

Center for Small Business
WPC's Center for Small Business "focuses on improving Washington's small business climate by working closely with business owners and policymakers. The Center provides accurate information and analysis on the state's regulatory climate, tax structure, health insurance systems, and more."

See also
State Policy Network
Freedom Foundation

References

External links
 

Research institutes in Washington (state)
Non-profit organizations based in Washington (state)